Plaza Carso is a large mixed-use development in the Nuevo Polanco area of Miguel Hidalgo, Mexico City, backed by billionaire Carlos Slim. The total cost of the complex is quoted between US$800 million and 1.4 billion. The complex claims to be the largest mixed-use development in Latin America. It was built on the site of a former Vitro glass factory.

The complex includes the following components:
 Museo Soumaya, owned by the Carlos Slim Foundation. The museum contains the Slim's extensive art, religious relic, historical document, and coin collection. The museum holds works by many of the best known European artists from the 15th to the 20th century including a large collection of casts of sculptures by Auguste Rodin. The building is a shiny silver cloud-like structure reminiscent of a Rodin sculpture.
 Museo Júmex, opened November 2013, to house part of the Colección Jumex, the contemporary art collection of the Jumex juice company.
 The Plaza Carso shopping center, featuring an  Saks Fifth Avenue store, the second to have opened in Mexico. Together with the atrium this section measures . 
Teatro Telcel theatre
 Residential towers: Torre Dalí, Torre Monet and Torre Rodin
 Office towers,  two of 23 floors each, and one of 20 floors. The three buildings are joined on the lower 3 levels by an atrium and the shopping center.
Torre Telcel - the headquarters of América Móvil are here
Torre Falcon
Torre Zurich
A 6-level underground parking garage

External links
 Photo of Carlos Slim touring the Plaza Carso project, Forbes, August 2010

References

Buildings and structures in Mexico City
Miguel Hidalgo, Mexico City
Mixed-use developments in Mexico
Shopping malls in Greater Mexico City
Buildings and structures completed in 2013
Carlos Slim